HMS Minorca was a xebec-rigged vessel that the British Royal Navy had built at Port Mahon Dockyard, Menorca (historically called "Minorca" by the British) in 1779. She participated in one major engagement in 1780. The Navy scuttled her in 1781.

Career
Minorca was built with a sloop hull, but broader. She was rigged as a xebec, with square-rigged and lateen sails. The Navy classified her as a ship-sloop. Commander the Honourable Charles S. Conway commissioned her in June 1778. On 4 March 1779, Patrick Leslie was promoted to Commander into Minorca, replacing Conway. Leslie received promotion to post captain on 26 January 1780. Knowles' replacement was Lieutenant, later Commander, Hugh Lawson.

The two-hour engagement was indecisive. Porcupine and Minorca withdrew because even if Montreal had struck, they could not have taken her off. Also, three other ships had appeared on the horizon. The French lost four killed, including their captain. The English had five killed and two wounded; two of the dead were on Minorca.

Fate
The Royal Navy sank Minorca on 21 August 1781 to block the entrance to the harbour at Port Mahon.

Citations

References
 
 

1779 ships
Ships of the Royal Navy